Kotla Waterfall is a waterfall located in Kotla, a village in northern Bagh District of Azad Kashmir.

See also
List of waterfalls of Pakistan

References

Bagh District
Landforms of Azad Kashmir
Waterfalls of Pakistan